Ek Nari Ek Brahmachari is a 1971 Indian Hindi-language comedy film, produced by P. Gangadhar Rao Jothee Navshakthee Combines and directed by K. Pratyagatma. It stars Jeetendra and Mumtaz, with music composed by Shankar Jaikishan. The film is remake of the Telugu film Brahmachari (1968).

Plot
Raisaheb Surajbhan Chaudhary lives a wealthy lifestyle in a palatial mansion with his wife of 30 years, Rajlaxmi, and two sons, Rajkumar, who has been married to Shyama for several years; and Mohankumar who is studying in an out of town college. Surajbhan is disappointed with Rajkumar as he has as not yet produced an heir to his family. To make matters worse Mohan, a devout worshiper of Lord Bajrangbali, has taken a vow of celibacy and refuses to get married. Things change dramatically when a young woman named Neena, along with her son, enters the Chaudhary household claiming that Mohan had married and abandoned her. She goes through a number of medical tests which determine that the child is actually an heir of the Chaudhary family. Now Surajbhan and Rajlaxmi want Mohan and Neena to get officially married, much to Mohan's chagrin. Things get complicated when Surajbhan finds out that the child is actually Rajkumar's, and that Neena may have been pulling the wool over all their eyes.

Cast
Jeetendra as Mohan Kumar Chaudhary
Mumtaz as Neena 
Shatrughan Sinha as Raj Kumar Chaudhary
Aruna Irani as Mala Singh
Sohrab Modi as Rai Sahib Surajbhan Chaudhary 
Durga Khote as Rajlaxmi Chaudhary  
Mukri as Thakur Chandan Singh
Jagdeep as Jugal Kishore  
Mohan Choti as Choti  
Keshto Mukherjee as Doctor 
Birbal as College Student
Polson as College Student   
Brahmachari as Madan
Mallika as Mumtaz's sister

Soundtrack

References

External links 
 

1971 films
1970s Hindi-language films
1971 comedy-drama films
Films scored by Shankar–Jaikishan
Hindi remakes of Telugu films
Indian comedy-drama films
Films directed by Kotayya Pratyagatma
1971 comedy films
1971 drama films